The 28th Los Angeles Film Critics Association Awards, given by the Los Angeles Film Critics Association (LAFCA) on 15 December 2002, honored the best in film for 2002.

Winners

Best Picture:
About Schmidt
Runner-up: Far from Heaven
Best Director:
Pedro Almodóvar – Talk to Her (Hable con ella)
Runner-up: Todd Haynes – Far from Heaven
Best Actor (TIE):
Daniel Day-Lewis – Gangs of New York
Jack Nicholson – About Schmidt
Best Actress:
Julianne Moore – Far from Heaven and The Hours
Runner-up: Isabelle Huppert – The Piano Teacher (La pianiste)
Best Supporting Actor:
Chris Cooper – Adaptation.
Runner-up: Christopher Walken – Catch Me If You Can
Best Supporting Actress:
Edie Falco – Sunshine State
Runner-up: Kathy Bates – About Schmidt
Best Screenplay:
Alexander Payne and Jim Taylor – About Schmidt
Runner-up: Charlie Kaufman and Donald Kaufman – Adaptation.
Best Cinematography:
Edward Lachman – Far from Heaven
Runner-up: Conrad L. Hall – Road to Perdition
Best Production Design:
Dante Ferretti – Gangs of New York
Runner-up: Mark Friedberg – Far from Heaven
Best Music Score:
Elmer Bernstein – Far from Heaven
Runner-up: Philip Glass – The Hours
Best Foreign Language Film:
Y Tu Mamá También • Mexico
Runner-up: Talk to Her (Hable con ella) • Spain
Best Non-Fiction Film:
The Cockettes
Runner-up: Bowling for Columbine
Best Animation:
Spirited Away (Sen to Chihiro no kamikakushi)
The Douglas Edwards Experimental/Independent Film/Video Award:
Michael Snow – *Corpus Callosum
Kenneth Anger (for his body of work)
New Generation Award:
Lynne Ramsay
Career Achievement Award:
Arthur Penn
Special Citation:
Lilo & Stitch for excellence in character design and animation.

References

External links
 28th Annual Los Angeles Film Critics Association Awards

2002
Los Angeles Film Critics Association Awards
Los Angeles Film Critics Association Awards
Los Angeles Film Critics Association Awards
Los Angeles Film Critics Association Awards